Fidaa is a 2017 Indian Telugu-language romantic comedy film written and directed by Sekhar Kammula, and produced by Dil Raju under Sri Venkateswara Creations banner. The film stars Varun Tej with Sai Pallavi (in her Telugu debut) in the lead roles. The plot follows a love–hate relationship between Bhanumathi (Pallavi), a strong-minded village girl, and her brother-in-law's brother Varun (Tej), an NRI from the US.

Principal photography commenced in August 2016, and was shot in Banswada of Telangana, Texas and Colorado.  The film's soundtrack is composed by Shakthkanth Karthik, with cinematography and editing by Vijay C. Kumar and Marthand K. Venkatesh, respectively.

The film won four Filmfare Awards from nine nominations, in addition to two SIIMA Awards. Sai Pallavi's performance was ranked by Film Companion amongst 100 Greatest Performances of the Decade. The film is considered one of the "25 Greatest Telugu Films Of The Decade" by Film Companion.

Plot
Varun is a non-resident Indian who lives in Austin, Texas, United States with his elder brother Raju and adopted, younger brother Bujji. He is a medical student aiming to become a neurosurgeon. Varun comes to India along with his younger brother for Raju's marriage to Renuka, whose family hails from Banswada in Telangana. There he meets Bhanumathi, Renuka's younger sister. Bhanu is a beautiful and confident girl who doesn't want to feel secondary to anyone. Gradually Varun and Bhanu develop a liking for each other but don't express it. Bhanu loves her father very dearly and doesn't believe in leaving him after her marriage. One day, she overhears Varun talking to his cousin Shailu about the opportunities in USA compared to India which he deems unfit for settling. Worse, his reference to a marriage between Shailu and her boyfriend is misconstrued by Bhanu as being between Varun and Shailu and so she feels cheated and misled by Varun. Heartbroken, Bhanu decides to forget Varun and suppress her feelings for him and starts to ignore him. After his brother's marriage, Varun returns to USA but can't stop thinking about Bhanu. He decides to confess his love to her. But Bhanumathi gives him a rude answer which enrages Varun creating a rift between them that widens further due to subsequent rude behaviors from both of them. Bhanu finally agrees to marry a man of her father's choice but realizes she isn't comfortable with him even before marriage.

Meanwhile, Renuka becomes pregnant So, she is advised bed rest by the doctors. Bhanu is sent to USA by her father to help Renuka cope up with the pregnancy. Varun starts being inconsiderate towards Bhanu during her stay with them. This disturbs Bhanu and an argument ensues between them after which she decides to leave for India in a week. Before leaving, Bhanu decides to visit her friend in USA and Varun is asked to drop Bhanu at her friend's place. On the way when Varun drops her at a bus stop so she can take a bus, both have their final fight. Realizing he has hurt her, Varun makes amends and confesses to Bhanu how deeply he loves her and cannot imagine his life with anyone else and that his bad behavior towards her was but a dirty mask to try and get rid of, albeit unsuccessfully, his feelings for her, but since he seeks her happiness, will respect and value her going forward. They then decide to stay as friends and he offers to show her America. It is during this cross-country USA roadtrip that Bhanu realizes how deep Varun's love for her is and she also rediscovers her own deep feelings for him. Before leaving for India, at the airport, Bhanu runs to Varun and hugs him with tearful eyes. Varun understands that Bhanu still loves him and a few days later goes to India to ask for her hand in marriage. Bhanu's father learns of their feelings for each other, and advises her to follow her heart and marry Varun instead of the man he chose to which she agrees. Though happy that she is marrying Varun, she is apprehensive about leaving her father and her village. After the wedding ceremony, Bhanu packs her luggage to leave for the USA. Renuka then tells her the truth that Varun actually gave up his life in the US and his medical seat and has decided to settle and practice as a Doctor in their village. Overjoyed, Bhanu runs to Varun and asks him how he could make such a big sacrifice to which he answers that wherever she is, it is his world because he loves her a lot. Varun decides to establish a hospital in the village and they live happily thereafter.

Cast

 Varun Tej as Varun
 Sai Pallavi as Bhanumati
 Sai Chand as Bhanumati's father
 Raja as Raju, Varun's brother
 Satyam Rajesh as Ali, Varun's friend
 Sharanya Pradeep as Renuka, Bhanumati's elder sister
 Dhaasshyam Geetha Bhaskar as Bhanumati's aunt
 Aryan Talla as Bujji, Varun's younger brother
 Gayathri Gupta as Sumathi, Bhanumati's friend
 Manisha Eerabathini as Shailu, Varun's cousin
 Harshvardhan Rane as Bhanumati's neighbor/suitor
 Katarina Richter as Suzie
 Kavitha Chandrasekher
 Gauri Priya

Soundtrack 

The film's music is scored by music director Shakthikanth Karthick and released on Aditya Music.

The song "Hey Pillagaada" is inspired by an older song "Parugulu Theeyaali" from the movie Malliswari (1951).

Release

Theatrical release 
The production of Fidaa began in August 2016 and the film was released worldwide on July 21, 2017. It was the seventh highest-grossing Telugu film of that year. It is dubbed into Malayalam and Hindi under the same title, and in Tamil as Banumathi.

Home media 
The film premiered on television in Star Maa channel on September 24, 2017, and received a massive 21.3 TRP just behind Bahubali and Magadheera.

Critical reception 

The Hindu critic Sangeetha Devi opined that the film was rooted in reality. "Director Sekhar Kammula returns with a heart-warming romantic musical, powered by compelling characters," she added. A reviewer from The Times of India rated the film three stars and wrote, "The plot line is too flimsy and simplistic; the climax is also a la Anand"

In his review for the Firstpost, Hemanth Kumar CR rated it 3.25 out of five, and stated, "The film is packed with relatable characters, a lead pair whose sparkling chemistry is bound to put a smile on your face, and a landscape which takes your breath away just by its sheer beauty and simplicity." Kumar however felt that the climax was rushed and the story itself needed better closure. Karthik Keramulu writing for The News Minute appreciated the lead cast performances by stating, "While Sai Palavi steals the show, Varun Tej plays the shy boy to perfection." The Indian Express critic Priyanka Sundar rated the film 3 stars of 5, and wrote: "Sekhar Kammula directorial Fidaa has done something unexpected yet again with this film which is to tell a story from the female perspective." She, however, added that the film falls short due to lack of strong supporting cast.

Awards and nominations

References

External links
 

2017 films
Films directed by Sekhar Kammula
2017 romantic comedy-drama films
2010s Telugu-language films
Films set in Texas
Films shot in Texas
Films shot in Telangana
Indian romantic comedy-drama films
Films shot in Colorado
Films set in Telangana
Sri Venkateswara Creations films